Luciana Castellina (born 9 August 1929) is an Italian journalist, writer, politician, and feminist.

Biography 
Luciana Castellina was born in Rome on 9 August 1929. She graduated in law from Sapienza University of Rome.

In 1947, she joined the Italian Communist Party. In 1974, she was co-founder of the Proletarian Unity Party for Communism. She served four terms in the Italian Chamber of Deputies and twenty years in the European Parliament. In the European parliament, she served as  chair of the Committee on Culture, Youth, Education and the Media and of the Committee on External Economic Relations.

She was president of Italia cinema, an agency to promote Italian films abroad, from 1998 to 2003.

She served as editor of Nuova Generazione, a Communist youth magazine, and of Liberazione, and also played an important role at Il Manifesto.

Castellina was named an Officier in the French Ordre des Arts et des Lettres and a Comendadora (Commander) of the Republic of Argentina.

With the 2015 presidential elections, Left Ecology Freedom supported Castellina's name as possible successor of Giorgio Napolitano as President of Italy. She has been supported for the first three ballots, until the party decided to support for the fourth ballot Sergio Mattarella who was later elected president.

Personal life
She has been married to communist leader Alfredo Reichlin. They had two children, Lucrezia and Pietro, both of them economists.

Selected books 
 Cinquant'anni d'Europa (2007)
 Eurollywood, Il difficile ingresso della cultura nella costruzione dell'Europa (2008)
 La scoperta del mondo, a finalist for the Strega Prize
 Siberiana, won the Letterario Vallombrosa Prize in 2012
 Guardati dalla mia fame (2014) with Milena Agus
 Manuale antiretorico dell'Unione Europea'' (2016)

References 

1929 births
Living people
Italian women journalists
Deputies of Legislature VII of Italy
Deputies of Legislature VIII of Italy
Deputies of Legislature IX of Italy
Deputies of Legislature X of Italy
Italian Communist Party MEPs
Communist Refoundation Party MEPs
MEPs for Italy 1979–1984
MEPs for Italy 1984–1989
MEPs for Italy 1989–1994
Candidates for President of Italy
Sapienza University of Rome alumni
Officiers of the Ordre des Arts et des Lettres
Italian feminists
Italian socialist feminists
Italian Communist Party politicians
Communist Refoundation Party politicians
Left Ecology Freedom politicians
Italian Left politicians
Il manifesto editors
Italian newspaper editors